Chalchik Anchinovich Chunizhekov (10 November 1898, Nizhny Kuyum, Altai1973, Gorno-Altaisk) was the oldest Altai writer and poet and a collector of oral folk art.

References

External links 
  Чунижеков Ч. А. Сказки для детей
 Студенты ГАГУ приняли участие в мероприятиях, посвященных 120-летию со дня рождения Ч. А. Чунижекова
  Русская портретная галерея

Soviet writers
1898 births
1973 deaths